Nishpap Munna is a 2013 Bengali action film directed by Bodiul Alam Khukon. It stars Shakib Khan, Sahara, Misha Sawdagor, Asif Iqbal, Ali Raj and Rehana Jolly in supporting roles. The film was released on May 31, 2013. Upon release, the film received positive to mixed reviews. The movie is a remake of 2006 Telugu film Chinnodu.

Plot
An orphan sentenced for the murder of his foster uncle, Munna spends most of his early life in jail. Upon his release, he tries his best to redeem himself despite facing several hurdles.

Cast
 Shakib Khan as Munna
 Sahara as Antara
 Misha Sawdagor
 Ali Raj
 Rehana Jolly
 Asif Iqbal as Arjo
 Afzal Sharif
 Sathi
 Jadu Azad
 Bipasha (item song)

Soundtrack
The soundtrack was composed by Ali Akram, with lyrics penned by Moniruzamman Monir and Kabir Bokul.

References

2013 films
2013 action films
Bengali-language Bangladeshi films
Bangladeshi action films
Films scored by Ali Akram Shuvo
Bangladeshi remakes of Indian films
2010s Bengali-language films
Bangladeshi remakes of Telugu films